The 2004 SEABA Under-18 Championship was the qualifying tournament for Southeast Asia Basketball Association at the 2004 FIBA Asia Under-18 Championship. The tournament was held in Lucena, Quezon, the Philippines from April 14 to April 17. Quezon Convention Center was the venue of all the games.
The hosts won their third overall title by sweeping all of their assignments to earn right to represent SEABA together with the second-placer Singapore.

Indonesia was supposed to participate at the tournament but withdrew a few days before the first match was due to be played

Round robin

|}

Final

Final standings

Awards

References

SEABA Under-18 Championship
2003–04 in Asian basketball
2003–04 in Philippine basketball
International basketball competitions hosted by the Philippines